Brown Edge is a civil parish in the district of Staffordshire Moorlands, Staffordshire, England. It contains six listed buildings that are recorded in the National Heritage List for England. All the listed buildings are designated at Grade II, the lowest of the three grades, which is applied to "buildings of national importance and special interest".   The parish contains the village of Brown Edge and the surrounding area.  The listed buildings consist of three farmhouses, a former watermill, a church, and a coach house.


Buildings

References

Citations

Sources

Lists of listed buildings in Staffordshire